Kasey Luke Aldridge (born 24 December 2000) is an English cricketer. He made his first-class debut in July 2021, for Somerset on the third day of their 2021 County Championship match against Leicestershire as a substitute for Craig Overton following his international call-up. Prior to his first-class debut, Aldridge was named in England's squad for the 2020 Under-19 Cricket World Cup.

Career
After attending Millfield School, Aldridge was already  when aged 17 he signed his first contract with Somerset, having played through all the age groups at the club and playing club cricket in Brislington and Weston-super-Mare. Aldridge began representing England at under-19 level in 2019.

On 8 June 2021, Aldridge took four wickets in four balls against Glamorgan Second XI dismissing David Lloyd and Marnus Labuschagne with the last two balls of one over, and then dismissing Chris Cooke and Kiran Carlson with his first two of his next over in the Somerset Second XI game at Taunton Vale. He made his List A debut on 25 July 2021, for Somerset in the 2021 Royal London One-Day Cup. He made his Twenty20 debut on 27 May 2022, for Somerset against the Sri Lanka Cricket Development XI during their tour of England.

References

External links
 

2000 births
Living people
English cricketers
Somerset cricketers
Devon cricketers
Cricketers from Bristol
People educated at Millfield